The Kinder is an American breed of domestic goat. It originated on a farm in Snohomish, Washington, where in about 1985 an American Pygmy buck was cross-bred with Nubian does. The resulting stock was selectively bred to create a compact but well-muscled goat, suitable both for milk and for meat production. A herd-book was started in 1988; by 2006 about three thousand head had been registered.

History 

The Kinder originated in about 1985 on a farm in Snohomish, Washington, in the north-western United States. There, an American Pygmy buck was cross-bred with Nubian does. The resulting stock was selectively bred to create a compact but well-muscled goat, suitable both for goat's milk and for goat's meat production. In 1988 a breed society, the Kinder Goat Breeders Association, was established, and a herd-book was started; by 2006 about three thousand head had been registered. The breed has spread within the United States, where it is present in about thirteen states, and also to Brazil and Canada.

The conservation status of the Kinder was listed by the FAO as endangered in 2007; in 2020 DAD-IS listed its status as unknown.

Characteristics 

The Kinder is of moderate size, with a sturdy body inherited from the American Pygmy, but with the longer legs of the Nubian. It is horned in both sexes, but in the United States is commonly disbudded. The coat is short; the breed standard does not specify any particular coat color.

Use 

The milk is claimed to have an average butterfat content of about 5.5%, occasionally reaching 7%; it is high in milk solids, and is thus suitable for cheese-making.

Like other goat breeds of tropical origin, the Kinder is an aseasonal breeder, and can be bred at any time of the year. It is a highly prolific breed – twin and triplet births are a normal occurrence. The kids put on weight rapidly; the dressed weight after slaughter averages approximately 60%.

References 

Goat breeds
Dairy goat breeds
Meat goat breeds
Goat breeds originating in the United States